Falls Road may refer to:

Roads
Falls Road (Baltimore)
Falls Road (Baltimore Light Rail station)
Falls Road, Belfast
Falls Road (Potomac, Maryland)

Rail
Falls Road Railroad, a short-line railway between Niagara Falls and Brockport, New York, United States
The Rochester, Lockport and Niagara Falls Railroad, also known as the "Falls Road", once operated on the same route as its namesake